Julián Alejandro Navas (born 30 November 1993) is an Argentine professional footballer who plays as a right-back for Arsenal de Sarandí.

Career
Navas started his career with Independiente Rivadavia. Navas completed a loan move in 2013 to Wiener Sport-Club of the Austrian Regionalliga. A year later, he returned to his parent club before being loaned back out to Torneo Federal B side Jorge Newbery (VM). He scored seven goals in thirty-five appearances over the 2014 and 2015 seasons. Navas' professional league debut arrived on 22 April 2016 for Independiente Rivadavia against Estudiantes, with a further appearance coming later that month versus Boca Unidos. A win over Santamarina in April 2018 saw Navas score his first goal for them.

In August 2020, Navas joined Primera División outfit Arsenal de Sarandí. His bow for the club occurred on 12 December in a 1–1 draw at La Bombonera against Boca Juniors.

Career statistics
.

Notes

References

External links

1993 births
Living people
Sportspeople from Mendoza, Argentina
Argentine footballers
Association football defenders
Argentine expatriate footballers
Expatriate footballers in Austria
Argentine expatriate sportspeople in Austria
Austrian Regionalliga players
Primera Nacional players
Argentine Primera División players
Independiente Rivadavia footballers
Wiener Sport-Club players
Arsenal de Sarandí footballers